Jack Kehler (May 22, 1946 – May 7, 2022) was an American character actor. He was best known for his role of Marty, a landlord in The Big Lebowski. He also appeared in Men in Black II, The Last Boy Scout, Point Break, Wyatt Earp and Waterworld.

Early years
Kehler was born on May 22, 1946, in Philadelphia, Pennsylvania.

Career
Kehler started to act in theatre at the age of 24. He studied with Sanford Meisner and Wynn Handman and became a member of the Actors Studio. His first film role was in Strange Invaders, released in 1983.

In the 1980s, he worked primarily on television, appearing in Hill Street Blues, Cagney & Lacey and St. Elsewhere. In the 1990s, he had roles in several action films, including The Last Boy Scout, Wyatt Earp and Waterworld. He appeared in the Coen brothers' 1998 cult film The Big Lebowski as Marty, the stammering landlord to Jeff Bridges' the Dude.

He recurred as Harlan Wyndam Matson on Amazon Prime's The Man in the High Castle.

Personal life
He was married to his wife Shawna Casey and had a son, Eddie Kehler, and a grandson Liam.

Death
He died from complications due to leukemia on May 7, 2022.

Filmography

Film

Television

References

External links

1946 births
2022 deaths
American male film actors
American male television actors
Male actors from Philadelphia
Deaths from cancer in California
Deaths from leukemia